Scheibbs is a town in Austria in the Scheibbs district of Lower Austria. In 1886, it became the first town in Austria to have street lighting powered by electricity.

Population

Mayors
1950-1965: Anton Herok
1965-1983: Alois Derfler 
1983-2007: Leopold Gansch 
2007-2009: Johann Schragl
2009-2019: Christine Dünwald
since 2019: Franz Aigner

Twin towns – sister cities
Scheibbs is twinned with:

  Rutesheim, Baden-Württemberg, Germany (1972)

Sons and daughters of the town

 Johann Heinrich Schmelzer (c. 1620-1680), court composer and first non-Italian court conductor at the Viennese court of Leopold I, Holy Roman Emperor
 Franz Schuh (physician) (1804-1865), physician and surgeon, first surgical procedure with ether anesthesia
 Hermann Senkowsky (1897-1965), financial expert, NSDAP official
 Andreas Buder (born 1979), ski racer
 Paul Scharner (born 1980), football player
 Marion Gröbner (born 1985), football player
 Kathrin Zettel (born 1986), ski racer
 Jonathan Schmid (born 1990), footballer
Klaudia Tanner (born 1970), politician and Minister of Defense

References

Cities and towns in Scheibbs District